James Benjamin Manning (July 21, 1943 – January 1, 2020) was an American professional baseball player.

Manning signed with the Twins in 1961 and spent his first professional season in the low minor leagues, in the Appalachian League.  He was kept on the Twins' opening-season 28-man roster (then permitted in MLB) in 1962, and made his debut in a home game April 15 against the Los Angeles Angels. Coming into the game in relief with Minnesota trailing, 6–0, he held the Angels scoreless on three hits in three innings pitched. In his fourth Major League game on April 28, he started against the Cleveland Indians at Municipal Stadium. Manning lasted only 2⅓ innings and gave up six runs (four earned) and seven hits; he had no decision in a game the Twins lost, 8–7.  Altogether, he surrendered ten runs, four earned, and 14 hits in seven Major League innings, striking out three and walking one batter.

Manning played in the minors through 1966, largely for the Charlotte Hornets of what is now the Southern League.

References

External links
Major League record and career statistics from Baseball Reference

1943 births
2020 deaths
Baseball players from Michigan
Charlotte Hornets (baseball) players
Major League Baseball pitchers
Minnesota Twins players
People from L'Anse, Michigan
People from Ontonagon County, Michigan
Wilson Tobs players
Wytheville Twins players
York White Roses players